Nils Fredrik Gösta Hillberg (28 July 1877, in Finland – 30 March 1958, in Stockholm) was a Swedish actor. Hillberg first worked at Vasateatern, Svenska teater and Sydsvenska skådebanan, he also worked at Dramaten. He was the son of actor Emil Hillberg, and in 1908 he married actress Berta Schantz. Besides doing many theater works he also acted in more than fifteen films between 1920 and 1944 amongst them Ombytta roller (1920) and Flickan från Paradiset (1924).

Selected filmography
 The Mill (1921)
The Blizzard (1923)
 Johan Ulfstjerna (1923)
 Where the Lighthouse Flashes (1924)
 Happy Vestköping (1937)
 A Crime (1940)

References

1877 births
1958 deaths
Swedish male stage actors
Swedish male film actors
Swedish male silent film actors
20th-century Swedish male actors